Kerstin Hensel (born 1961) is a German writer.

Biography
Hensel was born in 1961 in Karl-Marx Stadt in the former GDR. A trained nurse, she also studied at the Johannes R. Becher Institute of Literature in Leipzig. She has published numerous books in a variety of genres including novels, short stories, poetry and plays. She has won several literary prizes, among which the most notable are the Anna Seghers Prize in 1987 and the Lessing Prize (Förderpreis) in 1997.

Awards
 1987 Anna Seghers-Preis
 1991 Leonce-und-Lena-Preis of the City of Darmstadt
 1995 Scholarship Villa Massimo, Rome
 1998 Förderpreis Lessing Prize of the Free State of Saxony
 2000 Gerrit-Engelke-Preis
 2004 Ida-Dehmel-Literaturpreis
 2008 Stahlpreis Eisenhüttenstadt
 2012 Member of the Academy of Arts, Berlin
 2014 Walter-Bauer-Preis

References

External links
 

German women writers
1961 births
Living people